"No Beef" is a song by Dutch producer Afrojack in collaboration with American DJ Steve Aoki featuring vocals from singer Miss Palmer. The single was released digitally on 22 August 2011 in the Netherlands. The song was included as a bonus track in Aoki's 2012 debut album Wonderland.

Music video
A music video to accompany the release of "No Beef" was first released onto YouTube on 16 August 2011 at a total length of five minutes and thirty-two seconds. It was directed by Punit Dhesi and produced by Nima Nejat and Kam Saran. It features footage of both Afrojack and Aoki on stage and backstage at the 2011 Electric Daisy Carnival. The video also features guest appearances from American rapper Flo Rida, American model and former Playboy Playmate Holly Madison, professional poker players Michael Mizrachi, Antonio Esfandiari and Phil Laak, former Ultimate Fighting Championship Chuck Liddell and American rapper and record producer Lil Jon.

Track listing

Chart performance

Release history

References

2011 singles
Steve Aoki songs
Afrojack songs
Songs written by Afrojack
Songs written by Steve Aoki
2010 songs